Religion and peacebuilding refer to the study of religion's role in the development of peace. 

Nathan C. Funk and Christina J. Woolner categorize these approaches into three models. The first is “peace through religion alone”. This proposes to attain world peace through devotion to a given religion. Opponents claim that advocates generally want to attain peace through their particular religion only and have little tolerance of other ideologies. 
The second model, a response to the first, is “peace without religion”. Critics claim that it is overly simplistic and fails to address other causes of conflict as well as the peace potential of religion. It is also said that this model excludes the many contributions of religious people in the development of peace. Another critique claims that both approaches require bringing everyone into their own ideology.

The third and final approach is known as “peace with religion”. This approach focuses on the importance of coexistence and interfaith dialogue. Gerrie ter Haar suggests that religion is neither inherently good nor bad for peace, and that its influence is undeniable. Peace with religion, then, emphasises promoting the common principles present in every major religion.

A major component of religion and peacebuilding is faith-based non-governmental organizations (NGOs). Douglas Johnston points out that faith-based NGOs offer two distinct advantages. The first is that since faith-based NGOs are very often locally based, they have immediate influence within that community. He argues that “it is important to promote indigenous ownership of conflict prevention and peacebuilding initiatives as early in the process as possible.” The second advantage Johnston presents is that faith-based NGOs carry moral authority that contributes to the receptivity of negotiations and policies for peace.

Judaism and peacebuilding

Hebrew Bible

The Hebrew Bible contains many sources for religious peacebuilding. Some of which include:

The Priestly Blessing ends with: "May God lift up his face onto you and give you peace"
: "And I shall place peace upon the land"
: "Behold I give him my covenant of peace"
: Peace, peace to the distant and the close"
: The LORD examines the righteous, but the wicked, those who love violence, he hates with a passion.
: "Turn away from evil and do good; seek peace and pursue it"
:" The quiet words of the wise are more to be heeded than the shouts of a ruler of fools. Wisdom is better than weapons of war, but one sinner destroys much good.
:The wolf will live with the lamb, the leopard will lie down with the goat, the calf and the lion and the yearling together;and a little child will lead them. The cow will feed with the bear, their young will lie down together, and the lion will eat straw like the ox. The infant will play near the hole of the cobra, and the young child put his hand into the viper's nest. They will neither harm nor destroy on all my holy mountain, for the earth will be full of the knowledge of the Lord as the waters cover the sea.
  &  They will beat their swords into plowshares and their spears into pruning hooks. Nation will not take up sword against nation, nor will they train for war anymore.

Christianity and peacebuilding

Project Ploughshares

Project Ploughshares is a Canadian non-government organization concerned with the prevention of war, the disarmament of weapons, and peacebuilding. Though it is an agency of the Canadian Council of Churches and is sponsored by the nine national churches of Canada, Project Ploughshares is run by and for people of a variety of different faith backgrounds. Project Ploughshares works with various NGOs operating abroad to develop research and complete analyses of government policies. In the past, Project Ploughshares' work has included meeting with prime ministers to discuss nuclear disarmament, establishing and coordinating an agency for disarmament and security of the Horn in Africa, working with the UN and NATO on policy-making, and publishing research papers, one of which was endorsed by over 40 000 Canadians and had a serious influence over Canada's decision not to declare war on Iraq.

Project Ploughshares takes its name from Isaiah 2:4 where it is written "God shall judge between the nations, and shall decide for many peoples; and they shall beat their swords into ploughshares, and spears into pruning hooks; nation shall not lift up sword against nation; neither shall they learn war any more."

Pax Christi

Pax Christi is the "official international Catholic peace movement" as recognized by Pope Pius XII in 1952.

It was founded after World War II as reconciliary movement by French citizens including Bishop Pierre-Marie Théas of Tarbes and Lourdes. First goal was the reconciliation between France and Germany; the German branch or section later concentrated on reconciliation with Poland and initiated the foundation of the :de:Maximilian-Kolbe-Werk.

Today the Pax Christi network membership is made up of 18 national sections and 115 Member Organizations working in over 50 countries,
focusing on five main issues: human rights, human security, disarmament and demilitarisation, just world order, and religion and peace.

The Baháʼí Faith and peacebuilding

The Baháʼí Faith requires believers to avoid prejudice in daily life, to be friendly to people of all religions, social statuses, nationalities or various cultural traditions. At the nation's level, it calls for negotiation and dialogue between country leaders, to promote the process of world peace. For world peace, the Baháʼí Faith has the notion of "the Lesser Peace" and "the Great Peace". The previous one is considered the level of political peace, that a peace treaty is signed, and wars are eliminated; the latter refers to God's kingdom on earth, the world reaches its unity and in cooperation, all world's people uses an auxiliary language, a unified currency system, achieves economic justice, a world tribunal is available, and massive disarmament of all countries.

Bahá'u'lláh, the founder of the Baháʼí Faith, discouraged all forms of violence, including religious violence, writing that his aim was to: ``quench the flame of hate and enmity" and that the ``religion of God is for love and unity; make it not the cause of enmity or dissension." He warned of the dangers of religious fanaticism describing it as a ``world devouring fire", prohibited holy war, and condemned the shedding of blood, the burning of books, the shunning of the followers of other religions and the extermination of communities and groups. Bahá'u'lláh promoted the concept of the oneness of the world and human beings describing the Earth as "but one country, and mankind its citizens". Bahá'u'lláh identified the elimination of disunity as a necessary pre-requisite to peace.  "The well-being of mankind, its peace and security, are unattainable unless and until its unity is firmly established."

In 1985, as a contribution to the 1986 International Year of Peace, the international governing body of the Baháʼí Faith, the Universal House of Justice, released a major statement on the promotion of peace, that was distributed worldwide by the Baháʼí community. The statement sets out an analysis and strategy for creation of a more peaceful world. It identifies the following barriers to peace: racism, economic injustice, uncontrolled nationalism, religious strife, inequality between man and women, an absence of universal education, and the need for an international auxiliary language. The statement concludes with a call for establishment of the "oneness of humanity", a call which implies "no less than the reconstruction and the demilitarization of the whole civilized world — a world organically unified in all the essential aspects of its life, its political machinery, its spiritual aspiration, its trade and finance, its script and language, and yet infinite in the diversity of the national characteristics of its federated units."

Buddhism and peacebuilding

Buddhist scripture

Engaged Buddhism

Engaged Buddhism is a term coined by Thich Nhat Hanh in the 1960s to describe a more socially active form of Buddhism. Originating during the Indochina Wars with Nhat Hanh and the Unified Buddhist Church, adherents of Engaged Buddhism became participants in the war, not against the Americans or the Vietnamese, but against the violence itself, which they saw as unnecessary. They attempted to draw attention to the injustices of the war by placing themselves directly between the lines of battle and even engaging in self immolation.

Engaged Buddhism represents a socially aware non-violent movement within the larger Buddhist community. Inspired by the Buddhist tradition of the Peace Wheel and the teachings of non-violence of Siddhartha Gautama, Engaged Buddhism has since spread to other conflicts in other countries, with groups in Tibet, struggling for self-determination; in Burma and Cambodia, advocating for human rights; in Sri Lanka, promoting the Sarvodaya Shramadana Movement; and in India, working with untouchables. The group has also since opened up churches in the Western world.

See also

Christian pacifism
Pacifism in Islam
Ahimsa in Jainism
Judaism and peace
Islam and humanity
Morality in Islam
Religion
 Nontheistic religion
 Religious naturalism

References

Religion and politics
Peace and conflict studies
Religion
Religious studies
Religion and government